Fatman Mountain is a summit in Sanders County, Montana, in the United States.

References

Mountains of Sanders County, Montana
Mountains of Montana